John Patrick McManus (born 10 March 1951) is an Irish businessman and racehorse owner. His career spanned from the 1980s to the 2010s. He was a major shareholder of Manchester United, until his stake was bought out by Malcolm Glazer in 2005.

Early life
McManus was born in Limerick, Ireland, on 10 March 1951. He began his career at a plant hire firm.

Racehorse ownership
His first horse was Cill Dara, named after the county in Ireland. McManus's first Cheltenham Festival winner was a horse called Mister Donovan in 1982. Former champion jockey Jonjo O'Neill trains some of his horses at the Jackdaws Castle facility, which McManus owns. McManus's horse Don't Push It, ridden by McCoy and trained by O'Neill, won the 2010 Grand National Steeplechase. In 2021 McManus won the Grand National for a second time with his horse Minella Times, ridden by Rachael Blackmore and trained by Henry De Bromhead.

2010s awards
In 2012, McManus's horse Synchronised won the Cheltenham Gold Cup. Synchronised went on to run in the 2012 John Smiths Grand National with champion jockey Tony McCoy on 14 April 2012. Synchronised threw McCoy on the way to the starting area; after being caught and veterinary checks were performed, Synchronised was re-entered. However, he fell at Becher's Brook and sadly broke two legs and had to be put down. McManus had his 50th Cheltenham festival winner when Buveur d'Air won the 2017 Champion Hurdle.

Personal life
McManus is married to Noreen McManus, and has three children and four grandchildren.

In 2006, he built a €20 million residence next to Martinstown Stud. In 2013, he completed a €150 million home in Barbados.

McManus has been known for donating multiple times. In July 2012, McManus donated over €1 million to the Daughters of Charity foundation. In 2020, he donated equipment to the University Hospital, Dooradoyle, during the 2019–22 Coronavirus pandemic.

In 2012, McManus won $17.4 million gambling in the United States, of which $5.2 million was retained as income tax by the Internal Revenue Service (IRS). In 2016, The Irish Times reported that he was seeking a refund of the tax on the basis of the United States' double taxation treaty with Ireland; the IRS stated that McManus was a self-confessed tax exile out of Ireland and therefore – despite McManus's sworn affidavits to the contrary – not a legal resident of Ireland in 2012.

In July 2022, the sixth JP McManus Pro-Am golf tournament was held at Adare Manor, the first since 2010.

Health
McManus was diagnosed with cancer in late 2008 and after receiving treatment in the United States, he was said to have recovered well.

Glackin Report
In 1991, an Irish company law inspector, solicitor John Glackin, was appointed by the Irish Government to investigate complicated dealings involving Dermot Desmond and the purchase and sale of the former Johnston Mooney and O'Brien site in Ballsbridge, Dublin, to Telecom Éireann. While Desmond represented himself as an intermediary in the sale, Glackin's report said Desmond, businessman JP McManus and John Magnier were beneficiaries of the sale. Desmond strenuously disputed Glackin's findings.

According to the Glackin Report, Hoddle Investments (the vehicle through which the deal was handled) executed two contracts with Telecom Éireann for the sale of the Johnston Mooney & O'Brien site for an aggregate price of £9.4 million, on 7 May 1990. Glackin concluded that McManus had lent £1.5 million to Chestvale to purchase the site from the liquidator in August 1989. McManus made the investment through an AIB account in Jersey in the name of J&N McMahon. Whether this account was to the benefit of John and Noreen McManus was not confirmed as AIB refused to break client confidentiality.

The report concluded that McManus was a beneficiary of the sale of the site to Telecom Éireann, and received £500,000 in cash from the transaction, which Dermot Desmond had stored in a tennis holdall in his safe. At paragraph 5.4.4 of the report, Glackin concludes that:

No criminal charges were made against McManus or the other principals involved resulting from the findings of the Glackin Report.

References

External links

Not So ‘Sporting’ Limerick?

Irish racehorse owners and breeders
Irish gamblers
20th-century Irish philanthropists
Irish expatriates in Switzerland
Manchester United F.C. directors and chairmen
1951 births
20th-century Irish businesspeople
21st-century Irish businesspeople
Living people
People from Limerick (city)
21st-century Irish philanthropists